Anamika (translation: the one without a name) is an Indian Hindi language film starring Dino Morea, Minissha Lamba and Koena Mitra. It is written and directed by Anant Mahadevan and produced by Bhanwar Lal Sharma. The  film is based on Daphne du Maurier's 1938 literary classic, Rebecca.

Plot summary
Vikram Aditya Singh Sisodiya (Dino Morea), a rich industrialist from Rajasthan, comes to Mumbai for a business meeting and requests the services of an escort who actually will be his secretary for the day. Jia Rao (Minissha Lamba), employed by the escort service, makes a hash of her job, which prompts Vikram to train her to be a good escort. Before the day ends, he proposes marriage and she accepts.

She moves into his palatial bungalow where she is introduced to the caretaker Malini (Koena Mitra) and the support staff who do nothing but refer to the dead Mrs Sisidoya (Anamika). Everything in the mansion has her stamp "A" and Jia is trapped, until she musters enough courage to say that she is Mrs Sisodiya. Both try to save their marriage by burying the ghost of the past and by a twist of fate, are led to the body of Anamika. After the dead body is revealed Vikram gets arrested as he is accused of murdering Anamika.Then it is revealed that Malini their caretaker was in love with Vikram and planned this. She led Vikram to believe that Anamika had an affair with her cousin Sanjay. Malini allured Sanjay and they both portrayed Anamika as a characterless woman. Vikram, enraged by Anamika's "unfaithfulness" has a furious row with her and she storms off in anger. Malini follows her in another jeep on the pretence of saving Anamika from the desert storm. She later calls Vikram saying that the jeep Anamika took was stuck in storm and that Anamika was missing. In reality, Malini attacked Anamika and she died due to blunt force trauma on the head. 
Malini attacks Jia and reveals what she made of Anamika and was about to do the same to her.
As Vikram realises it he goes to save Jia who was about to die in the fire by Malini. And Malini burns herself alive and Vikram and Jia happily live their life together

Cast
 Minissha Lamba as Jia Rao/ Sisodiya
 Dino Morea as Vikram Singh Sisodiya
 Koena Mitra as Malini
 Achint Kaur as Vishakha Rajput, Vikram's sister
 Gulshan Grover as Shekhar Rajput

Soundtrack
The soundtrack was composed by Anu Malik and lyrics penned by Sameer. The complete album released on 1 October 2007.

Track listings

References

External links
 

2000s Hindi-language films
2008 films
Indian mystery films
Films based on works by Daphne du Maurier
Films scored by Anu Malik
Indian remakes of American films
Films directed by Anant Mahadevan
Works based on Rebecca (novel)